People who served as the mayor of the City of Holroyd, in the state of New South Wales, Australia, including its former title as the mayor of Prospect and Sherwood are:

References

Mayors Holroyd
Holroyd, Mayors
Mayors of Holroyd